João Manuel Dinis, commonly known as Comboio, (born 13 October 1979) is a Portuguese football defender playing for Omonia Aradippou. During his stay in Cyprus he played also for  Doxa Katokopias, Aris Limassol and Elpida Xylofagou.

Comboio previously played for Alverca, Estoril, Barreirense and Olhanense in the Portuguese Liga de Honra. He left Barreirense to join Olhanense for the 2006–07 season.

He joined Cypriot side Doxa Katokopia before the 2008–09 season.

References

1979 births
Living people
People from Figueira da Foz
Portuguese footballers
Portuguese expatriate footballers
Association football defenders
Ermesinde S.C. players
C.D. Fátima players
F.C. Alverca players
G.D. Estoril Praia players
F.C. Barreirense players
S.C. Olhanense players
Doxa Katokopias FC players
Aris Limassol FC players
Omonia Aradippou players
Cypriot First Division players
Cypriot Second Division players
Expatriate footballers in Cyprus
Portuguese expatriate sportspeople in Cyprus
Expatriate footballers in Angola
Portuguese expatriate sportspeople in Angola
F.C. Oliveira do Hospital players
Sportspeople from Coimbra District